Harrison Andrew Delbridge (born 15 March 1992) is an Australian professional soccer player who plays for K League 1 club Incheon United and the Australia national team.

Club career

Youth and amateur
Delbridge played four years of college soccer at Division 1 Appalachian State University between the years of 2010 and 2013 playing 54 games, starting in 46 and captaining the team in his senior year. Over the course of his college career he scored 9 goals and had 1 assist and received the following recognitions: 
NSCAA Scholar All-America Team (2013) 
NSCAA All South Region Team (2013)
NCCSIA University Division 1 All-State Team (2013)
All-Conference Team (2013)
Adidas Tournament All-Tournament (2012)
Southern Conference All-Tournament (2011)

Carolina Railhawks
In 2012 Delbridge  also played for Carolina Railhawks U23 going to the National playoffs. In 2013, he played with Ventura County Fusion in the USL PDL.

Sacramento Republic
Delbridge signed his first professional contract in March 2014, joining USL Pro expansion club Sacramento Republic. Delbridge made his professional debut in Sacramento's first ever game, a 1-1 draw against LA Galaxy II, and was selected to the USL team of the week for his performance. Under the guidance of head coach Preki and technical director Graham Smith, Sacramento went on to win the USL Championship in their inaugural year.

Portland Timbers 2
On 19 February 2015, Delbridge signed with United Soccer League club Portland Timbers 2.

FC Cincinnati

Delbridge joined USL expansion side FC Cincinnati on 21 January 2016. He was named to the USL All-League First Team at the end of the 2016 season, and then again at the end of the 2017 season.

Melbourne City
On 28 November 2017 it was announced that Delbridge signed to A-League club Melbourne City on a three-year contract.
On 21 December 2019, Delbridge scored his first goal for the Melbourne City side with a commanding header against local rivals Melbourne Victory.

Incheon United
On 27 January 2021 it was announced that Delbridge signed to K League 1 club Incheon United on a two-year contract.

International career
14 September 2022, he had first call-up to the Australia men's national soccer team.

25 September 2022, he made his debut, in the starting XI for the Australia men's national soccer team in their 2-0 win over the New Zealand national football team.

Career statistics

Club

Honours

Individual
 USL All-League Team: 2016, 2017

References

External links
 
 
 

1992 births
Living people
Australian soccer players
Australian expatriate soccer players
Appalachian State Mountaineers men's soccer players
Ventura County Fusion players
Sacramento Republic FC players
Portland Timbers 2 players
FC Cincinnati (2016–18) players
Melbourne City FC players
Incheon United FC players
Association football defenders
Expatriate soccer players in the United States
Australian expatriate sportspeople in the United States
Expatriate footballers in South Korea
Australian expatriate sportspeople in South Korea
USL League Two players
USL Championship players
Australia international soccer players
Soccer players from Sydney